Diplodactylus barraganae, sometimes called the Gulf fat-tailed gecko, is a gecko endemic to Australia.

Taxonomy
The species name honours María Elena Barragán who is an important herpetologist from Ecuador, for her contributions to reptile conservation and public education.

Distribution
It is found in the Gulf Country in the border region between the Northern Territory and Queensland.

References

Diplodactylus
Reptiles described in 2014
Geckos of Australia
Taxa named by Patrick J. Couper
Taxa named by Paul M. Oliver
Taxa named by Mitzy Pepper